The 2022 Giro d'Italia was the 105th edition of the Giro d'Italia, a three-week Grand Tour cycling stage race. The race started on 6 May in Budapest, Hungary, and finished on 29 May in Verona, Italy.

Hindley came into the race as one of his team's three potential GC leaders before taking the team leadership when he won stage 9, which finished atop Blockhaus. Over the last half of the race, he emerged as one of the strongest climbers, staying within ten seconds of the race lead until stage 20 to Marmolada. On that stage, he rode away from the rest of the contenders on the final climb to move into the race lead, which he kept in the final day time trial. Carapaz took the maglia rosa on stage 14, holding a slim advantage over Hindley. The two were inseparable until the penultimate stage, when Carapaz was dropped inside the final three kilometres. He dropped to second place, which he solidified in the final day time trial. He performed consistently in the mountains, emerging as one of the strongest climbers in the race to take his first podium result in a Grand Tour since the 2015 Giro.

In the race's other classifications, Arnaud Démare of  won the points classification. He was the race's best sprinter, winning three sprint stages along the way. Koen Bouwman of  won the mountains classification while also winning two stages from the breakaway. Juan Pedro López of  won the young rider classification. Apart from finishing in the top ten, López also held the maglia rosa for ten days before losing it to Carapaz midway through the race.  took both the teams classification and the fair play classification. Filippo Tagliani of  won the intermediate sprint classification for taking the most points in intermediate sprints while his teammate, Mattia Bais, took the breakaway classification for spending the greatest number of kilometres in the break. Meanwhile, Mathieu van der Poel of  won the combativity classification. He also won the first stage and held the maglia rosa for the first three days before getting into multiple breaks over the rest of the race.

Teams 

Although  are invited to all UCI World Tour events, they declined their invitation to this year's Giro deciding to focus on the Tour de France and the Vuelta a España.

Pre-race favourites 

Richard Carapaz, the 2019 champion, was considered the pre-race favourite, followed by Simon Yates and João Almeida. Their closest challengers were seen to be Miguel Ángel López, Mikel Landa and 2017 champion Tom Dumoulin. Other contenders were considered to be Wilco Kelderman, Romain Bardet and Hugh Carthy. Defending champion Egan Bernal did not participate, as he had not recovered from injuries suffered on a training ride during the offseason.

Riders believed to be the main contenders for victories on the sprint stages were Mark Cavendish, Mathieu van der Poel, Arnaud Démare, and Caleb Ewan.

Route and stages

Classification leadership 

 On stage 2, Pello Bilbao, who was third in the points classification, wore the cyclamen jersey, because first placed Mathieu van der Poel wore the pink jersey as leader of the general classification, and second placed Biniam Girmay wore the white jersey as the leader of the young rider classification. Additionally, Magnus Cort Nielsen wore the blue jersey, although Van der Poel, Girmay and Bilbao were the only riders to score in the mountains classification until that point.
 On stages 3 and 4, Biniam Girmay, who was second in the points classification, wore the cyclamen jersey, because first placed Mathieu van der Poel wore the pink jersey as leader of the general classification. Because Van der Poel also led the mountains classification before stage 3, Rick Zabel, who was second in the mountains classification, wore the blue jersey on that stage.
 On stages 5–9, Mauri Vansevenant, who was second in the young riders classification, wore the white jersey, because first placed Juan Pedro López wore the pink jersey as leader of the general classification. On stages 10–14, João Almeida wore the white jersey for the same reason.
 On stage 18, Juan Pedro López, who was second in the young riders classification, wore the white jersey, because first placed João Almeida withdrew before the start of the stage.

Final classification standings

General classification

Points classification

Mountains classification

Young rider classification

Team classification

Intermediate sprint classification

Breakaway classification

Fair play classification

References

External links 

 

2022
2022 in road cycling
2022 in Italian sport
2022 in Hungarian sport
 
2022 UCI World Tour
May 2022 sports events in Italy
May 2022 sports events in Hungary